Pegu (also Romanized as Pegū and Pogū) is a village in Byaban Rural District, Byaban District, Minab County, Hormozgan Province, Iran. At the 2006 census, its population was 332, in 59 families.

References 

Populated places in Minab County